Annie Morrill Smith (February 13, 1856 – November 11, 1946) was an American botanist and bryologist from Brooklyn. She was a largely self-taught amateur who became important to the Sullivant Moss Society. From 1906 to 1911 she acted as the sole editor of The Bryologist. She also published a number of important genealogical books. Born Annie Elizabeth Morrill, she was a daughter of Cynthia (Langdon) and Henry Edwin Morrill, M.D. She was educated at Packer Collegiate Institute, and in 1880 married Hugh Montgomery Smith, a physician who died unexpectedly in 1897.

When she was young, Annie Morrill Smith had studied botany abroad, and became interested in bryophytes and lichens. She was acquainted with Elizabeth Gertrude Britton and Abel Joel Grout, cofounders of the Sullivant Moss Society. After her husband died, she became associate editor of The Bryologist, the publication of the Society. In 1905, she became the formal editor and served in this role until 1911. During this time she used much of her personal wealth to keep the Society solvent. She served as treasurer of the Society for 10 years; she was vice president for seven years; and president for two years. 

She also published several genealogical books, including From One Generation To Another (1906) about the Langdon family, Morrill Kindred in America (1914) about the Morrills, and Ancestors of Henry Montgomery Smith and Catherine Forshee (1921).  She is buried at Green-Wood Cemetery, Brooklyn.

References

External links

1856 births
1946 deaths
American women botanists
Bryologists
People from Brooklyn
20th-century American botanists
American women writers
American editors
Women bryologists
Scientists from New York (state)
20th-century American women scientists
Burials at Green-Wood Cemetery
19th-century American women scientists